Denika Kassim (born August 8, 1997) is a Comorian sprinter. She competed at the 2016 Summer Olympics in the women's 100 metres race; her time of 12.53 seconds in the preliminary round did not qualify her for the first round.

References

1997 births
Living people
Comorian female sprinters
Olympic athletes of the Comoros
Athletes (track and field) at the 2016 Summer Olympics
Olympic female sprinters